John Thomas Blackburn (January 24, 1912 – March 21, 1994) was an American naval aviator, World War II flying ace, and the first commanding officer of the famed F4U Corsair squadron VF-17 Jolly Rogers.

Early life
John Thomas Blackburn was born in Annapolis, Maryland, and raised in Washington D.C., and graduated from Western High School.  His father and brother were naval officers.

Navy career
Blackburn graduated from the United States Naval Academy in 1933, became a Naval Aviator, and was a flight instructor in 1941 when the United States entered World War II.

Lieutenant Commander Blackburn was anxious to get into combat, but was relegated to flying the Brewster F2A Buffalo at Opa Locka Naval Air Station near Miami.

First command, VGF-29
After several requests for a combat assignment, he received orders in July 1942 to organize VGF-29 as commanding officer and report aboard the new escort carrier . VGF-29 was equipped with the Grumman F4F-4 Wildcat. Blackburn assembled a ready room of mainly brand new ensigns fresh from winning their wings at advanced flying school at Naval Air Station Corpus Christi.

Blackburn set up operations at a remote field at Pungo well away from the brass and traffic at NAS Norfolk and was soon promoted to Lieutenant Commander. Pungo suited Blackburn fine as he wanted an undisturbed environment to get the squadron acquainted with the Wildcat and ready for deployment and the combat likely to follow.

The squadron embarked aboard USS Santee in October 1942 to participate in Operation Torch, the Allied invasion of North Africa. Arriving in the waters off Morocco on November 6, VGF-29 flew first combat mission on 8 November but could not find their target, and poor weather and damaged homing equipment aboard Santee forced them to ditch or force-land their Wildcats. Blackburn floated adrift in a liferaft for 3 days before he was spotted by a destroyer and rescued. Thus ended VGF-29's inauspicious debut and Blackburn's first combat deployment. Shortly thereafter, Blackburn was ordered to stand up a new squadron.

The Jolly Rogers, VF-17
Blackburn stood up VF-17 on January 1, 1943 at NAS Norfolk. It initially had a few North American SNJ trainers and F4F Wildcats awaiting delivery of the first Vought F4U Corsairs in February. It was the second Navy fighter squadron to receive the F4U-1 Corsair, the first to fly them in combat, and the most successful of them all during a combat tour in the Solomon Islands. Blackburn wanted to motivate his pilots with a squadron insignia which would live up to the Corsair name and chose the skull and crossbones and the name "The Jolly Rogers". Harry Hollmeyer, as squadron pilot conceived the original design, which was painted on the cowling of the Corsairs that were also known as "hogs."

This name was bestowed by "Dog Ears" Coleman, a young pilot in Jumpin' Joe Clifton's VF-12, the first Corsair squadron. Blackburn named his Corsair "Big Hog" and together with his executive officer, Roger Hedrick embarked on an intensive training program to get his squadron ready for the planned deployment to the Pacific in August 1943, and the combat that lay ahead. Again, he chose a remote field well away from Norfolk to operate as he saw fit and away from prying eyes of the senior leadership.

The squadron deployed aboard  and worked hard to adapt the F4U Corsair to the carrier environment, which necessitated some design changes, resulting in the F4U-1A model.

The Jolly Rogers deployed to the Pacific, but upon arrival there the Navy decided to initially land base its Corsairs.  The squadron flew to Guadalcanal on October 26 where it received orders to begin operating out of Ondongo (which means "Place of Death") on the island of New Georgia in the Solomon Islands.  They arrived on the 27th, just in time to participate in providing air cover for the Landings at Cape Torokina, near Empress Augusta Bay on Bougainville Island on 1 November; this drew attention from the considerable Japanese presence at their bastion of Rabaul. Blackburn and his Jolly Rogers were assigned the high cover mission for the landings and ran into a wave of Japanese Aichi D3A "Val" dive bombers escorted by Mitsubishi A6M Zero fighters. Blackburn downed two and the squadron three more in their combat debut.

On November 8, 1943, The Jolly Rogers faced their biggest test to date when six Jolly Rogers faced an attack of 15 Japanese D3A "Val" dive bombers escorted by 24 A6M "Zeros". Hedrick launched with a flight of eight Corsairs, but lost two when they aborted.  In the engagement, VF-17 downed three fighters and damaged four others with no losses. In its two tours of duty in the Solomon Islands, VF-17 had 152 aerial victories and produced 11 aces. Blackburn ranked third with 11 victories behind Hedrick with 12 and Ira Kepford who led the squadron with 17. VF-17 finished its last combat tour in the Solomons on May 10, 1944 and many pilots were reassigned.

Cdr Blackburn led VF-17 (January 1943 – May 1944) to become the greatest fighter squadron with confirmed 154 enemy kills (an 8:1 loss ratio) plus 75 probable kills.  They sank five transport ships and barges.  No plane they escorted was ever shot down, not even in flights against Rabaul.  In 76 days of combat they flew 8577 combat hours and produced 13 flying aces.  Forty years later, his pilots publicly credited the squadron's skipper for its success; he taught them much and was successful in getting equipment and supplies they needed. A series of interviews with former pilots and ground crew of VF-17, including Tommy Blackburn and fighter ace Ike Kepford, was held and videotaped at the Glenview Naval Air Station in Glenview, Il in 1984. That recording is still available on DVD from RDR Productions in Glenview, IL

Aerial victories

USS Midway
In 1945, he became CAG (Commander, Air Group) of Carrier Air Group 74 (CVBG-74) aboard the newly commissioned aircraft carrier , shortly before V-J Day. In 1958-1959, he commanded the Midway.

Shore duty
After World War II he worked at the Pentagon.

Commander Blackburn was an early jet pilot in the Navy.  He flew a Bell YP-59A Airacomet at Naval Air Test Center, Patuxent, on 13 May 1946, the 120th American naval aviator qualified to fly a jet airplane.

While commanding HATWING-1, Captain Blackburn participated in a demonstration of carrier mobility.

Retirement
He retired from the Navy in 1962.

In mid-1962 Blackburn began growing wine grapes and raising "blue ribbon" Golden Retrievers in St. Helena, California.

He had two children, Pattie and Mark, with former wife Rosalie Reed.

After selling his St Helena, California, vineyard and home to Gene and Cody Kirkham, who transformed the property into Casa Nuestra Winery, Blackburn lived in Jacksonville, Florida with his second wife, Jamie Brashears, and died there.  He was buried at Arlington National Cemetery.

A replica of his F4U Corsair, with the Jolly Roger insignia and "Big Hog" written on the vertical stabilizer and the number one on the fuselage, was installed at the Washington Navy Yard in 1985.

Awards and decorations
His awards include:

Navy Cross citation

Lieutenant Commander John Thomas Blackburn
U.S. Navy
The President of the United States of America takes pleasure in presenting the Navy Cross to Lieutenant Commander John Thomas Blackburn, United States Navy, for extraordinary heroism in operations against the enemy while serving as Pilot of a carrier-based Navy Fighter Plane in Fighting Squadron Sevnteen (VF-17), attached to the U.S.S. Hornet (CV-12), while participating in aerial flights against the enemy in the New Britain theater. In thirty-two days Lieutenant Commander Blackburn flew thirty combat sorties, twenty-one of which were escort missions or fighter sweeps over the Rabaul area, and on thirteen of which he encountered enemy aircraft. On 26 January, when the bombers which he was escorting were intercepted by more than fifty enemy fighters, he destroyed one of them. On 30 January the light bombers he escorted were aggressively intercepted by twenty enemy fighters. In repeated attacks he destroyed two of them and probably shot down three more. On 9 February he led a flight of eight Corsairs which found an enemy ship at anchor and sank it with machine gun fire. His outstanding devotion to duty, his heroic conduct against numerically superior enemy forces, his daring and aggressive airmanship were in keeping with the highest traditions of the United States Naval Service.

Books
 1989: The Jolly Rogers: The story of Tom Blackburn and Navy Fighting Squadron VF-17. – New York: Orion Books. – .

References

1913 births
1994 deaths
American World War II flying aces
Aviators from Washington, D.C.
United States Naval Academy alumni
United States Navy pilots of World War II
Deaths from cancer in Florida
Recipients of the Navy Cross (United States)
Recipients of the Distinguished Flying Cross (United States)
Burials at Arlington National Cemetery